The Herald was a monthly magazine of politics and current affairs published by the Dawn Media Group from 1970 to 2019 in Karachi, Pakistan. The Herald has been responsible for producing many large and breaking stories since it started.

It was renamed from the Illustrated Weekly of Pakistan in January 1970, which was published from 1948–1969.

It was Pakistan's most widely read monthly magazine, providing in-depth analyses, investigative reporting and an extensive coverage of current affairs. The magazine enjoyed a wide circulation abroad, particularly among academics and Pakistani expatriate communities in the Middle East, United Kingdom and North America.

It stopped publication after its July 2019 issue.

See also
 List of magazines in Pakistan

References

External links
Official website
List of Pakistani Newspapers and Magazines on ABYZ News Links website

1970 establishments in Pakistan
2019 disestablishments in Pakistan
Dawn Media Group
Defunct magazines published in Pakistan
Defunct political magazines
English-language magazines published in Pakistan
Magazines established in 1970
Magazines disestablished in 2019
Mass media in Karachi
Monthly magazines published in Pakistan
Political magazines published in Pakistan